Home is a surname. Notable people with the surname include:

 Alexander Home (disambiguation), multiple people
 Anna Home (born 1938), English television producer
 Anne Hunter (née Home) (1742–1821), poet and socialite
 Anthony Home (1826–1914), Scottish Victoria Cross recipient
 Daniel Dunglas Home (1833–1886), Scottish spiritualist
 David Home (disambiguation), multiple people
 Duncan Home (1828–1857), British Victoria Cross recipient
 Everard Home (1756–1832), British physician
 Francis Home (1719–1813), Scottish physician
 Gerald Home (born 1950), Northern Irish actor
 Gordon Home (1878–1969), English artist
 Guy Home (born 1964), English cricketer
 James Everard Home (1798–1853), British Royal Navy officer
 John Home (1722–1808), Scottish poet and dramatist
 John Home, Lord Renton, Senator of the College of Justice
 Robert Home (1752–1834), British painter
 Stewart Home (born 1962), English artist and writer

See also
 Alec Douglas-Home (1903–1995), British prime minister 1963–64
 A. M. Homes (born 1961), American writer